Bnei al-Salam Rahat,  is an Israeli football club based in Rahat. The club currently plays in Liga Gimel South division.

History
The club was founded in 2011 by members of the Al-Krenawi family and played in Liga Gimel since, usually finishing in mid-table. In 2015–16, the club finished as runners-up of its division, just two points behind division champions Maccabi Segev Shalom.

In the cup, the club's best achievement is reaching the fourth round in 2012–13, eventually losing to Maccabi Ironi Sderot.

External links
Bnei al-Salam Rahat The Israel Football Association

References

Bnei al-Salam
Rahat
Association football clubs established in 2011
Bedouins in Israel